Yeargin is a surname. Notable people with the surname include:

Al Yeargin (1901–1937), American baseball player
Marshalyn Yeargin-Allsopp, American epidemiologist
Nancy Yeargin (born 1955), American tennis player
Nicole Yeargin (born 1997), British athlete